John Perceval, 4th Earl of Egmont (13 August 1767 – 31 December 1835), styled Viscount Perceval from 1770 to 1822, was a British peer and politician. He was unsuccessful in his attempt to enter the House of Commons in 1790, but entered the House of Lords when he succeeded to the Barony in 1822.

Perceval was the only son of John Perceval, 3rd Earl of Egmont and his wife Isabella Paulet. With the support of his father, he contested Bridgwater in the 1790 election in opposition to the Government. However, the interest of Earl Poulett carried the day, returning the Earl's brother Vere Poulett and John Langston with 186 and 161 votes, respectively, while Lord Perceval only drew 87.

On 10 March 1792, Perceval married Bridget Wynn daughter of Glyn Wynn. His father disapproved of the marriage, and did not attempt to put him up as a candidate again.

Perceval succeeded his father as Earl of Egmont in 1822. As his father also held the British peerage of Baron Lovel and Holland, he entered the British House of Lords. His wife Bridget died on 24 January 1826 and he died on 31 December 1835. They had one son Henry Perceval, 5th Earl of Egmont (1796–1841).

References

1767 births
1835 deaths
Earls of Egmont